Hans Rudolf Jagenburg (18 August 1894 – 5 January 1971) was a Swedish high jumper. He competed at the 1920 Summer Olympics and finished in ninth place.

Nationally Jagenburg won two titles, in 1913 and 1922. In 1918 he won the Scandinavian triangular meet and was ranked fifth in the world.

References

1894 births
1971 deaths
Swedish male high jumpers
Olympic athletes of Sweden
Athletes (track and field) at the 1920 Summer Olympics
People from Borås Municipality
Sportspeople from Västra Götaland County
20th-century Swedish people